The 1963 BAC One-Eleven test crash was a fatal accident of a British Aircraft Corporation prototype aircraft on 22 October 1963, near Chicklade in Wiltshire, England while it was undertaking a test flight. All seven crew members on board the BAC One-Eleven were killed.

Accident

The accident occurred during a test flight of the first prototype BAC One-Eleven (registration G-ASHG) which had taken off from Wisley Airfield with seven crew on board, piloted by Mike Lithgow. The aircraft was on its fifth test flight to assess stability and handling characteristics during the approach to—and recovery from—a stall with the centre of gravity in varying positions. The aircraft broke up on impact at Cratt Hill, near Chicklade, a small village in southern Wiltshire and caught fire, killing all seven crew on board.

The aircraft was on its fifth stalling test of the day, and the crash occurred 23 minutes after takeoff from Wisley. The crew were Lt. Cdr. M J Lithgow OBE, Chief Test Pilot; Capt. R Rymer (Test Pilot); B J Prior (Aerodynamicist); C J Webb (Designer); R A F Wright (Senior Observer); G R Poulter (Observer) and D J Clark (Observer).

Cause
The cause of the accident was the aircraft entering a stable stalled condition, recovery from which was impossible due to the wings blocking the airflow over the elevators on the tail. This was the first accident to be attributed to the phenomenon known as deep stall, peculiar to rear engine T-tailed aircraft.

Aftermath
Once the condition of deep stall was recognised, relatively simple preventative measures were introduced, including stick-shakers indicating an approaching stall and stick-pushers which automatically operate the elevators and physically lower the nose before the stall is reached, while the tailplane and pitch controls are still effective.

Memorial
In October 2013 a stone memorial was dedicated at the crash site, listing the seven victims. The ceremony was attended by the CO of the Royal Navy Historic Flight; Lord Margadale (the owner of the land); and families of the crew members. The memorial bears a quotation from the annotation of the 1817 edition of The Rime of the Ancient Mariner, a poem by Samuel Taylor Coleridge: '...and everywhere the blue sky belongs to them and is their appointed rest and their native country.'

From Family member Daniel Wright: My Grandad Richard Wright, died as the senior observer in this flight. At the time his wife (Jean Wright) was pregnant as they always wanted a son. When Richard Wright died in this crash, David was born shortly after 28/01/1964 David Richard John Wright, having Richard in his name to remember his farther he never got to meet.David went on and worked in British aerospace in mechanics and plane parts testing. David also had a son Daniel. We wish we could have met you in person. But are proud of you and the crew helping make flights safer. Lots of love. 

Daniel Wright - (living relative)

See also
1966 Felthorpe Trident crash
British European Airways Flight 548

References

External links
 https://www.baaa-acro.com/sites/default/files/2017-12/G-ASHG.pdf
 http://aviation-safety.net/database/record.php?id=19631022-0
 http://www.planecrashinfo.com/1963/1963-52.htm 
 https://web.archive.org/web/20120402184556/http://www.baaa-acro.com/photos/BAc111-BAC-Bournemouth.jpg
 1963 Pathe film 'The Price of Progress' of the crash site and BAC 111 prototype G-ASHG in British United livery https://www.youtube.com/watch?v=Sdw9TcHGTZI

Aviation accidents and incidents in 1963
Aviation accidents and incidents in England
Accidents and incidents involving the BAC One-Eleven
1963 disasters in the United Kingdom
1963 in England
October 1963 events in the United Kingdom
Airliner accidents and incidents caused by stalls